The Makumunu Assumbo caecilian (Idiocranium russeli) is a species of African caecilian in the family Grandisoniidae.   It is one of the smallest of caecilians, and is found in Cameroon. It is monotypic in the genus Idiocranium.

References

Endemic fauna of Cameroon
Indotyphlidae
Amphibians described in 1936